Harold Long (12 December 1929 – 24 June 2006) was a South African cricketer. He played in thirty first-class matches for Eastern Province between 1952/53 and 1960/61.

See also
 List of Eastern Province representative cricketers

References

External links
 

1929 births
2006 deaths
South African cricketers
Eastern Province cricketers
People from Makhanda, Eastern Cape
Cricketers from the Eastern Cape